Bill Kaysing (July 31, 1922 – April 21, 2005) was an American writer who claimed that the six Apollo Moon landings between July 1969 and December 1972 were hoaxes, and so a founder of the Moon landing conspiracy theories.

Early life and education
Kaysing was born on July 31, 1922 as William Charles Kaysing, to a German-American family in Chicago, Illinois. His father was Charles William Kaysing.While he was a boy, his family moved to South Pasadena, California. He is described as growing up:in South Pasadena, California... [with a childhood] like something out of Huckleberry Finn. He had a paper route, went rafting on the Arroyo Seco River, and ate apples he found behind the grocery store. He couldn’t wait to leave home. His violent and abusive father died when he was nine; his mother was emotionally absent; and he had very little to do with his older brother, who would later become an aeronautical engineer.

Kaysing served in the United States Navy during World War II as a midshipman, and later attended Navy Officers Training School, and the University of Southern California. He went on, after the war, to receive a B.A. in English literature, in 1949, from the University of Redlands.

Professional History

Kaysing graduated high school at 17, and worked for "a single week... in a furniture factory when he decided it wasn’t for him... [then] made his way to San Pedro, where he got a job on a fishing boat and got paid in fish."

After the Navy and college he "worked briefly as a salesman, an insurance claims examiner, and a cabinetmaker...", and in this post-university, pre-technical period, his writing career involved publishing on a variety of subjects. Kaysing then found work as a technical writer at Rocketdynes jet propulsion laboratory, a division of North American Aviation, in 1956, in the period prior to the development of the Apollo missions. In September 1956, he became a service analyst there, in 1958 a service engineer, and in 1962 a publications analyst. From 1956 to 1963 Kaysing served as head of technical publications for Rocketdyne. On May 31, 1963, he resigned for personal reasons.

In the years that followed, Kaysing has been described as suffering from "chronic anxiety, which, over time, turned into full-blown disillusionment with modern life," leading him to get rid of the family television over the objections of his family, and to "tras[h] his radio and cance[l] his newspaper subscription." Thereafter, he led his family, initially, into an itinerant lifestyle, one that eventually led to breakup of the family, but also to an opportunity to write about their lifestyle. Darryn King, writing for Medium.com, describes the time in this way:He bought a trailer with bunk beds for the girls and embarked on a “year-round vacation.” Before long, he parted ways with his wife and family too. For the better part of the next decade, Kaysing had no fixed address. He foraged for food and picked up odd jobs—freelance writing, fruit-picking, security, and selling dentistry equipment by mail-order.

He returned to writing in a relationship with Straight Arrow Press, then-publisher of the Rolling Stone, in work that would eventually involve photojournalist Robert Altman (photographer) and designer Jon Goodchild, both from the magazine; his first work was The Ex-Urbanite’s Complete & Illustrated Easy-Does-It First-Time Farmer’s Guide, which dispensed "wisdom on everything from acorns to yurts in his homespun writing style, with epigraphs quoting William Faulkner and the Old Testament and [Altman] photographs of hippie layabouts." In this and subsequent works, Kaysing "was passionate about teaching readers how to live healthful, low-cost, and adventurous lives", presenting readers with "lyrical passages about the exquisite pleasures of fresh air, wildflowers, geothermal springs, and motorcycling through the desert." It was in the period of related writing that followed that books began to include darker tones and themes of social protest, and in this period of a "rambling, tax-evading lifestyle" also led to a new relationship, and his new wife would co-write his work.

Charges of an Apollo Hoax

Kaysing would come to assert in a new vein of writing that came to fruition in the mid-1970s, that during his much earlier tenure at Rocketdyne he was privy to documents pertaining to the Mercury, Gemini, Atlas, and Apollo programs, and argued that one did not need an engineering or science degree to determine that a hoax was being perpetrated. According to his account of this intellectual development, the Rocketdyne scientists with whom he worked expressed to him that there was enough technology at the time to perhaps send a crewed rocket to the Moon, but not enough technology developed to return safely to Earth. They also spoke of the very real problem of traveling through atmospheric radiation without harm to the astronauts as a problem that yet  needed to be solved. Even before July 1969, he had "a hunch, an intuition, ... a true conviction" and decided that he did not believe that anyone was going to the Moon. Kaysing thus wrote a book titled We Never Went to the Moon: America's Thirty Billion Dollar Swindle, which was self-published in 1976, and republished by Health Research Books in 2002.

In his book, Kaysing introduced arguments which he said proved the Moon landings were faked. Claims in the book including that:
 NASA lacked the technical expertise to put a man on the Moon.
 the absence of stars in lunar surface photographs was indicative of a hoax.
 there were unexplained optical anomalies in the photographs taken on the Moon.
 there was an absence of blast craters beneath the Lunar Modules, and that the rocket engines of the Lunar Modules should have generated an enormous dust cloud near their landing sites the final seconds of descent.
 the death of Thomas Baron, a quality control and safety inspector for North American Aviation, was mysterious and indicative of a hoax.

He also noted that Dutch newspapers questioned the "authenticity" of the Moon landings.

Charges of other conspiracies
Kaysing also claimed that NASA staged both the Apollo 1 fire and the Space Shuttle Challenger accident, deliberately murdering the astronauts on board, suggesting that NASA might have learned that these astronauts were about to expose the conspiracy and needed to guarantee their silence. He also believed that the disappearance of Thomas Baron's 500-page report on the Apollo 1 fire and Baron's death in a rail-traffic accident a week after he testified before the United States Congress were not accidents.

A vocal advocate of other conspiracy theories, Kaysing believed there to be a high-level conspiracy involving the Central Intelligence Agency, Federal Reserve, Internal Revenue Service and other government agencies to brainwash the American public, poison their food supply, and control the media.

Media participations
Kaysing appeared on the Oprah show.

Kaysing was a participant in the Fox documentary, Conspiracy Theory: Did We Land on the Moon?, which aired on February 15, 2001.

Kaysing had an appearance on the Documentary, "Moon Landing - The World's Greatest Hoax?" which was uploaded to YouTube on March 5, 2021.

Lovell defamation lawsuit
On August 29, 1996, Kaysing filed a defamation lawsuit in Santa Cruz County Superior Court against astronaut Jim Lovell for calling his claims "wacky" in an article by Rafer Guzmán for Metro Silicon Valley. Lovell is quoted:

The guy is wacky. His position makes me feel angry. We spent a lot of time getting ready to go to the Moon. We spent a lot of money, we took great risks, and it's something everybody in this country should be proud of.

The case was dismissed in 1997.

Kaysing's Theory

Original theory from We Never Went to the Moon (1976)

Kaysing describes preparation for the launch as normal, but since Rocketdyne F-1 engines in the first stage of the Saturn V rocket were "totally unreliable," a cluster of "five booster engines of the more dependable B-1 type as used in the C-1 cluster for the Atlas missile" were secretly installed, one inside each of the Saturn V's five F-1s.

Revised theory from Conspiracy Theory: Did We Land on the Moon? (2001)
Kaysing states that:

The astronauts were launched with the Saturn V. Then, in order to account for their disappearance, they simply orbited the Earth for eight days and in the interim they showed these fake pictures of the astronauts on the Moon. But on the eighth day the command console separated from the vehicle and descended to Earth as, of course, was shown in the films.

Responses to Kaysing

In March 2013, expeditions financed by business and space entrepreneur Jeff Bezos recovered pieces of rockets from the Apollo program, artifacts that were seen as contradicting Kaysing's published claims of the disuse of the Rocketdyne F-1 engines.

Legacy
Kaysing encouraged Ralph René to write NASA Mooned America!, after René decided that he also had research to prove the landings were faked.

Kaysing's daughter, Wendy L. Kaysing, has stated that she hopes to one day write a book about her father with Kaysing's nephew, Dietrich von Schmausen, not to reiterate Kaysing's hoax claims, rather to talk about her father as a person.

Fake Tribute website and Flat Earth misappropriation

In the years following Kaysing’s death, Italian conspiracist writer Albino Galuppini created the Bill Kaysing Tribute Website. This website was described as being “designed to pay tribute to a distinguished writer who lived his ideals and spoke his mind honestly and openly” and contained many personal photos provided by Kaysing’s relatives and tributes written by his followers. Including Bart Sibrel, David Percy and Jarrah White.

But from 2013 onward, Galuppini started publishing blog articles propagating false claims about the Earth being flat and all space travel being faked. Many of these articles misappropriated Kaysing’s moon hoax views to promote Galuppini’s Flat Earth claims. Despite Kaysing specifically theorizing that the astronauts orbited the Earth instead of going to the Moon, Galuppini falsely claimed that Kaysing denied any rocket could travel fast enough to get into orbit. This led to Kaysing’s relatives and followers publicly withdrawing their endorsement from the Bill Kaysing Tribute Website, severing their ties with Galuppini, and no longer allowing him permission to use their content. 

Wendy Kaysing stated "I cannot imagine my father ever saying that we could not do space travel. That’s ludicrous! That’s ridiculous! […] Anybody who says that about my father is just trying to discredit my father’s ability to even think" and requested that Galuppini cease and desist the “sale of books, articles, or publication of websites, blogs or public messages” that use her father’s work. But Galuppini ignored her demands and continued the public façade of being a trusted friend of Kaysing’s family and supporters. Jarrah White, a former contributor to the website, stated that Kaysing's legacy had essentially been "hijacked" and spoke harshly of Galuppini's Flat Earth nonsense and misappropriation in Popular Mechanics: "If you think the Earth is flat, then I don't consider you a serious researcher. I think you are a kindergarten dropout. Serious hoax researchers, they base their evidence on scientific and photographic anomalies and go where the evidence takes them. Flat-Earthers preemptively deny space travel in general because any photos of the Earth from space contradict their religion."

Selected Bibliography

Personal life
After his time in the Navy, Kaysing married and had two daughters. One marriage was to Carol M. de Ridder, which ended in divorce. A second marriage was to Ruth Cole Kaysing.

Kaysing died on April 21, 2005 in Santa Barbara, California.

See Also
 Moon landing conspiracy theories
 Bart Sibrel

Notes

References

References

Further reading
  A more recent report on Kaysing, including interview material from late in his life.
   Biography of her father, by the daughter of Bill Kaysing.

External links
Bill Kaysing Tribute Website
A February 16, 1996, radio interview  with Nardwuar the Human Serviette

1922 births
2005 deaths
Moon landing conspiracy theorists
American conspiracy theorists
20th-century American male writers
United States Navy personnel of World War II
University of Redlands alumni